Butcher Babies is an American groove metal band from Los Angeles, consisting of frontwomen Heidi Shepherd and Carla Harvey, guitarist Henry Flury (Amen), bassist Ricky Bonazza, and drummer Chase Brickenden. Their debut album, Goliath, was released on July 9, 2013, via Century Media Records. It sold 3,300 copies in the US during its first week of release and charted at No. 3 on the Billboard Heatseeker chart and No. 112 on the Billboard 200.

History

First release and rise (2011–2012)
The Butcher Babies were formed by vocalists Heidi Shepherd and Carla Harvey in 2010. The band self-released their first EP in 2011. In July 2011, they released a comic book at the Comic-Con in San Diego on July 23 and 24. The comic book was written by Harvey and illustrated by Anthony Winn. Rock journalist Keith Valcourt stated in his review of one of the band's shows: "The Butcher Babies deliver a loud crashing blend of heavy metal, punk and thrash that recalls Pantera, adding their stage show embodies the horror antics of Alice Cooper and Rob Zombie. Carla and Heidi don't merely sing: they assault the crowd with a blinding flash of aggression and abuse. And the crowd loves them for it." They gained a lot of attention from their YouTube video of them performing "Fucking Hostile" by Pantera.

On January 6, 2012, the Butcher Babies premiered a new song, "Mr. Slowdeath". On May 24, they released their first music video for "Mr. Slowdeath", which was produced by Mudrock (Avenged Sevenfold, Godsmack), which is from the band's self-released EP.

Goliath and Take It Like a Man (2013–2017) 
The band signed a worldwide deal with Century Media Records in November 2012, and a month later embarked on a North American tour from January to February with Marilyn Manson. Only days after wrapping the tour in the City Of Sin, the band was in an L.A. studio with producer Josh Wilbur (Gojira, Lamb of God, Hatebreed) recording their debut album, Goliath.

On June 6, the band released the street single off their debut album "I Smell A Massacre". On June 20, the band streamed another song titled "The Deathsurround". On July 9, the band released their debut album Goliath via Century Media Records. During the first week of sales, the album sold 3,300 copies in the United States which landed it at No. 112 on The Billboard 200 chart.

The Butcher Babies toured on the Rockstar Energy Drink Mayhem Festival 2013 on the Jägermeister Stage and then toured with Danzig along with Texas Hippie Coalition, and A Pale Horse Named Death.

On July 26, In an interview with Artisan News, Shepherd and Harvey spoke about their decision to ditch the nipple-tape look during their live performances. Their appearance over the course of the last six years consisted of this look as an ode to the late Wendy O. Williams. However, they claimed that the message of creativity and individualism had been received and it was time to evolve to another look.

In early 2014, the band took part in The Hell Pop Tour II headlined by In This Moment with additional support from Devour the Day, West Hollywood heavy metal ensemble All Hail the Yeti and Los Angeles melodic metal quartet Before the Mourning.

On November 5, 2014, the band announced that they had begun work on their upcoming second studio album. The band completed work on the album on April 3, 2015. The band revealed that the album was a return to their thrash metal roots whereas Goliath was more melodic. The band also revealed the new album will feature a rerecorded version of their first single from 2010, "Blonde Girls All Look the Same".

On June 10, 2015, the band revealed the title of their upcoming album to be Take It Like a Man, and also released the first single of the album, "Monsters Ball", despite original plans to release 'Never Go Back" as the lead single. The band revealed that the record label and management expressed dislike for the album title and artwork, and that the band had to fight to keep them. Regarding the album title, vocalist Carla Harvey said:  On June 26, the band released a music video for the lead single, "Monsters Ball". On July 11, the band released the song "Never Go Back" as the second single of the album.

Lilith (2017) 
In October 2016, following the departure of original drummer, Chris Warner,
Butcher Babies introduced their new drummer Chase Brickenden after he filled in on the band's tour with Megadeth. The band's third studio album Lilith was released on October 27, 2017. The album cover art and insert panel was designed by American artist Justin Paul.

Upcoming fourth studio album (2019–present) 
On January 22, 2019, Butcher Babies posted a black and white slogan and pictures with possible titles of songs in the upcoming fourth album on their instagram page @butcherbabies. The album title and its date of release have yet to be announced.
On October 30, 2020, Butcher Babies released a new song called "Bottom of the Bottle" followed by ‘Sleeping with the Enemy’ which was release later that year on December 11.

The band released further singles during 2021 with ‘Yorktown’ on February 12, ‘Last Dance’ on April 7 and ‘It’s Killin’ Time, Baby!’ on August 27. 

On 28 October 2022 the band released another single ‘Best Friend’, (a cover originally performed by the artist Saweeti) followed by ‘Beaver Cage’ on 10 February 2023.

Latest interviews with the band have suggested that they have now finished work on their as yet, untitled fourth album which is rumoured to be released in 2023.

Musical style and influences
Butcher Babies' music has been described as heavy metal, groove metal, and thrash metal. The band has cited artists and bands such as Pantera, Guns N' Roses, Marilyn Manson, Slayer, and Slipknot as their influences. However, the band Plasmatics had the biggest influence on the band. In an interview, they stated "We are big fans of Wendy O. Williams. We took the name from the Plasmatics Song "Butcher Baby". Wendy was a bad ass… she didn't give a fuck what anyone thought… we share that spirit". In an interview with Revolver Magazine, Harvey said: "As a biracial kid growing up in the Detroit area, I got a lot of shit for loving hard rock and metal, and seeing musicians that were also African American playing the music I loved made me strong enough to say, "Fuck you, I'm going to like what I want."
While Shepherd had said "My heroes are Slipknot, Wendy O. Williams, Gwen Stefani, and Joan Jett. Most of them being females that defy the male dominance in music!" They also stated in an interview, they are heavily influenced by horror films such as The Texas Chain Saw Massacre, House of 1000 Corpses, and The Devil's Rejects.

In an interview from the Rockstar Mayhem Festival, Shepherd stated that she is very influenced by Slipknot, while Harvey stated that she is heavily into old school metal such as Slayer and Iron Maiden, Klein's favorite band is Cannibal Corpse, and Flury's favorite is Meshuggah. Butcher Babies are influenced by the nu metal genre.

The Butcher Babies are known for their aggressive stage appeal, such as wearing nipple tape in the earlier years of their career. This attire is heavily influenced by Wendy O. Williams of the Plasmatics. Shepherd stated in an interview that "Wendy O. Williams was the first female in heavy metal. She had that single, 'Butcher Baby', hence the name BUTCHER BABIES, and she was the first female to just really go all out. She didn't care what anyone told her. She was going to be the performer she wanted to be without anyone telling her 'No'. We were both hugely influenced by her, and that's where the attire came from."

Members
Current members
 Carla Harvey – vocals (2009–present)
 Heidi Shepherd – vocals (2009–present)
 Henry Flury – guitars (2009–present)
 Chase Brickenden – drums (2017–present)
 Ricky Bonazza – bass (2020–present)

Former members
 Jason Klein – bass (2009–2019)
 Chris Warner – drums (2009–2017)

Timeline

Discography

Studio albums

EPs

Singles
 "Never Go Back": #39 US Mainstream Rock

Music videos

References

2010 establishments in California
American groove metal musical groups
Metalcore musical groups from California
Century Media Records artists
Heavy metal musical groups from California
Female-fronted musical groups
Musical groups established in 2010
Musical quintets